Ylona Jade Garcia(born 28 February 2002) is a Filipino-Australian singer, songwriter and actress. Garcia made her breakthrough in the Philippines in 2015 when she became a part of the television series Pinoy Big Brother where she finished as first runner-up at the end of the competition. She is currently based in the United States consistently releasing music and is now working internationally through 88rising.

Early life and career

2002–2015: early life and career beginnings
Ylona Jade Garcia was born on February 28, 2002, in Sydney, Australia to Filipino parents, Peter Garcia and Caridad Navalle-Garcia; both of whom are medical practitioners based in Australia. She is the third among five siblings. At a young age, Garcia began performing as a front act for several Filipino singers and musicians such as Martin Nievera, Sarah Geronimo and Rivermaya's former lead vocalist Bamboo Mañalac during their concert stops in Australia. Garcia also performed at the Filipino Fiesta in September 2014 where she sang Zedd and Ariana Grande's song "Break Free" with a video of the performance uploaded on her YouTube channel. She has also participated in numerous singing competitions and won in two notable ones namely the Urban Star Sydney Championship in December 2014, for which she received the "Most Promising Talent" award, and the Fast Track Australian Singing Competition in March 2015 as part of the junior division. Garcia also finished third in the National Urban Star Competition reaping through the Judge's Choice segment for the "Coolest Artist" and the "Artist with the 'Wow' Factor" awards.

2015–2020: breakthrough

In 2015, Garcia auditioned to become a housemate for the first part of the second special season of ABS-CBN's reality television series Pinoy Big Brother, where she passed after showcasing her talents in singing, acting and dancing as well for her "confidence and candid remarks." She entered the house on the second day with Franco Rodriguez, who was later hailed as the second runner-up; Kyle Secades and Zonia Mejia. During her time in the house, Garcia composed and recorded two songs, "Win the Fight" (2015), for which she composed and recorded with her fellow housemate Jimboy Martin; and "Magmahal Muli" (2005, lit. To Love Again), for which she recorded with her fellow housemate Bailey May; originally composed and recorded by Sam Milby and Say Alonzo from the first season of Pinoy Big Brother (2005). The songs were later featured on the extended play PBB 737 (2015) and was released on Spotify on 9 August 2015. After passing four eviction nights as a nominated housemate, she was selected as one of the four finalists after garnering 19.84% of the public vote and exited the Big Brother house on the fiftieth day, for the second part of the special season to commence. However, during an episode of ABS-CBN's noontime variety series It's Showtime! (2009), Garcia and her fellow finalists Jimboy Martin, Bailey May and Rodriguez were instructed to return to the Big Brother house. During her second time in the house, Garcia participated in the final weekly task, "Short Film Festival," with her fellow finalists and the five remaining housemates of the second part of the second special season, and was cast in Pinoy Big Brother'''s romantic comedy film Trending: Love (2015, stylized as TRENDING: LOVE), where she portrayed the fictional character Sophie Mendoza.

On 14 August 2015, Garcia participated in the Teen Power: The Kabataang Pinoy Concert Party with her former Pinoy Big Brother: 737 housemates and finalists from the first part of the second special season, as well as other teenage actors and musicians including Alexa Ilacad and Gimme 5. On 8 November 2015, Garcia was hailed as the first runner-up to Martin during the Big Night ceremony at the Albay Astrodome in Legazpi, Albay, garnering 42.24% of the public vote. In the same month, she was cast with May as part of the extended cast of ABS-CBN's romantic comedy television series On the Wings of Love (2015–16), where they portrayed the fictional character Audrey Olivar and Harry Fausto respectively At the end of 2015, Star Music named Garcia as their representative for their "#SpotifySpotlight" segment in 2016.

In 2016, Ylona revealed on the musical variety television show ASAP that her debut studio album would be released "very, very, very, very soon." On 21 January 2016, Coca-Cola announced Ylona as one of the ambassadors for their "Taste the Feeling" campaign together with Bailey May, James Reid, Nadine Lustre, Maine Mendoza, Alden Richards, Liza Soberano, Enrique Gil, Janella Salvador, and Enchong Dee. On 31 January 2016, Ylona was announced as the "Celebrity VJ" for the month of February for the music television network Myx. On 4 February 2016, Ylona was signed by Star Music. She eventually announced that her upcoming debut studio album will be released soon; hinting possibilities of her debut studio album releasing sometime during early-mid 2016.

In the same year, she joined the reality music competition We Love OPM: The Celebrity Sing-Offs as part of Team Yeng: Oh My Girls. She, together with Alexa Ilacad and GirlTrends member Krissha Viaje were coached and trained by their mentor Pop Rock Royalty Yeng Constantino. The girls finished the competition as runner-ups just behind the grand winner, Team Erik's Tres Kantos.

In 2018, Garcia became a member of the teen pop group ASAP G!. Other members of the group are Isabela Vinzon, Jayda Avanzado, Kyle Echarri, Jeremy Glinoga and Darren Espanto. The group formed on 3 June 2018 and disbanded in November 2018, when the show was reformatted into ASAP Natin 'To.

In 2019, Garcia transferred from Star Music to Homeworkz for her recording label.

On 3 May 2020, Ylona Garcia released the music video for her single "Walk In My Timbs" which features R&B artist Jay-R. The song made its official debut performance on 8 May through Philippine morning show Umagang Kay Ganda. Jay-R revealed that Ylona is the actual writer of the song while praising her amazing writing skills at a very young age which makes him inspire and learn a lot from her.

On 3 December 2020, Ylona Garcia performed on 88rising's Double Happiness Winter Festival performing her single "Spilt Milk" and a cover of "Winter Things" by Ariana Grande.

2021–present: 88rising, international endeavor
On 24 February, American-Asian international record label 88rising released a mysterious  photo of Garcia on Twitter with its caption "sooner than you think". The label on 27 February officially announced the addition of Garcia as their new artist and will be handled by "Paradise Rising", a label under 88rising and Globe Telecom that focuses on Filipino artists.

Garcia on 1 March announced that she is gearing up for her next comeback announcing the single's title "All That" alongside the release of the song's video teaser on her official social media platforms. On 3 March, Paradise Rising released the official music video of Garcia's single "All That". The song garnered attention and reached more than one million views on YouTube in four days.

In an announcement made by 88rising on August 26, Garcia was confirmed to be making her next comeback with a brand new single "Don't Go Changing" for the Head in the Clouds'' album. On November 7, Garcia flamed up the Rose Bowl stadium in Pasadena, California
with her 20-minute spotlight in the Head in the Clouds Music Festival 2021 stage.

In January 2022, Garcia released her new single "Entertain Me", released in partnership with the tactical shooter game VALORANT. The song was used in the game's trailer for its new Agent, Neon. On the 25th, Ylona disclosed that she has since relocated to Los Angeles, California, in the US and will stay in the country for good to further pursue her career in music.

In August 2022, Ylona became the first Filipino to be featured on the pages of American fashion magazine V for its Fall 2022 edition. On Instagram, V referred to Ylona as "the new global voice leading R&B Pop."

Other ventures

Ambassadorship

On June 2017, Ylona was part of the new set of endorsers by T&J Salon Proffesionals. On December 2017, Ylona was introduce as the brand ambassador of Café Amazon in the Philippines.

On September 2019, Pond's Philippines launched a community of women that encourages fellow women to face their hesitations and see what happens. The campaign aims to provide women with a platform to share inspiring stories on how they overcame their hesitations to become the best version of themselves, headed by Ylona, Kathryn Bernardo, Heart Evangelista, Nadine Lustre, and Gabbi Garcia.

Discography

Extended plays

Singles

As lead artist

Collaborative singles

Soundtrack appearance

Videography

Music videos

Filmography

Series

Hosting

Television

Concert and tours

Concerts

Concert participation

Performances on award shows, television shows and specials

Awards & nominations

Notes

References

External links

2002 births
Living people
Citizens of the Philippines through descent
Filipino child actresses
Filipino film actresses
Pinoy Big Brother contestants
Singers from Sydney
Australian people of Filipino descent
Australian expatriates in the Philippines
Star Magic
ABS-CBN personalities
Star Music artists
21st-century Australian singers
21st-century Australian women singers
Filipino television actresses
21st-century Filipino women singers